Shahryar, (foaled 13 April 2018) is a Japanese Thoroughbred racehorse. He won his only start as a juvenile in 2020 and made rapid improvement in the following spring as he ran third in the Tokinominoru Kinen before taking the Mainichi Hai and Tokyo Yushun.

Background
Shahryar is a dark bay or brown horse with a white star and white socks on his hind legs bred in Japan by Northern Farm. The horse entered the ownership of the Northern Farm associate Sunday Racing and was sent into training with Hideaki Fujiwara. He is not a large horse by Thoroughbred standards, weighing around 450 kg. He usually races in a hood.

He was from the eleventh crop of foals sired by Deep Impact, who was the Japanese Horse of the Year in 2005 and 2006, winning races including the Tokyo Yushun, Tenno Sho, Arima Kinen and Japan Cup. Deep Impact's other progeny include Gentildonna, Harp Star, Kizuna, A Shin Hikari, Marialite and Saxon Warrior. Shahryar's dam Dubai Majesty was a top class performer on dirt in the United States, recording her biggest win when taking the Breeders' Cup Filly & Mare Sprint as a five-year-old in 2010. Two days after her Breeders' Cup win the mare was put up for auction at the Fasig-Tipton Kentucky November select breeding stock sale and bought for $1,100,000 by Northern Farm's Katsumi Yoshida. She was a descendant of the Virginia-bred mare Knight's Gal who was the female-line ancestor of many good winners including Palace Malice and Mutafaweq. The mare had previously produced Sharyar's full-brother Al Ain.

Racing career

2020: two-year-old season
On his first and only start as a juvenile, Shahryar started the 1.3/1 favourite for a newcomers' race over 1800 metres on firm ground at Kyoto Racecourse on 25 October. Ridden by Yuichi Fukunaga he turned into the straight in fourth place before finishing strongly to win by a neck from Vivant, with four lengths back to Sunrise Golazo in third place.

2021: three-year-old season

For his first run as a three-year-old, Shahryar was partnered by Fukunaga when he was stepped up in class to contest the Grade 3 Tokinominoru Kinen on 14 February over 1800 metres at Tokyo Racecourse. Starting the 3.9/1 second favourite he finished strongly but never looked likely to win and came home third behind Efforia and Victipharus. On 27 March at Hanshin Racecourse, the colt started second favourite behind Great Magician for the Grade 3 Mainichi Hai in which he was ridden by Yuga Kawada. After settling in fifth place he made progress to take the lead in the straight and held off a strong challenge from Great Magician to win by a neck in a race record time of 1:43.9. Commenting on the race some time later Shahryar's assistant trainer Nobuyuki Tashiro stated: "It was a good win, with a very fast time, showing how good his reactions are. It became clear that a run in the Derby would be his next target."

On 30 May at Tokyo Shahryar was reunited with Fukunaga when he was one of seventeen three-year-olds to contest the 88th running of the Tokyo Yushun over 2400 metres. In the build-up to the race Hideaki Fujiwara said "He’s developing really nicely, and everything’s gone as I would have expected with him... He's an easy horse to ride and there’s no doubt he has ability. The jockey feels good about what the horse has done in training, including his usual work uphill. The 2,400 meters at Tokyo will be good for him." He went off the 10.7/1 fourth choice in the betting behind Efforia, the filly Satono Reinas (runner-up in the Oka Sho) and Great Magician while the other contenders included Wonderful Town (winner of the Aoba Sho), Titleholder (Yayoi Sho), Stella Veloce (Saudi Arabia Royal Cup), Gratias (Keisei Stakes), Bathrat Leon (New Zealand Trophy), Red Genesis (Kyoto Shimbun Hai), Victipharus (Spring Stakes) and Lagom (Kisaragi Sho). Fukunaga settled his mount in mid-division on the inside as Bathrat Leon set a steady pace from Titleholder and entered the straight in eleventh place. Satono Reinas gained the advantage in the straight before giving way to Efforia but Shahryar, having struggled to obtain a clear run began to make rapid progress. He moved up to challenge the favourite in the final strides and prevailed by a nose in a record time of 2:22.5. After the race Fukunaga said "It's so great to have won the Derby which I had made it my target with this colt ever since his debut. We were keeping an eye on the race favorite but the race didn’t go as smoothly as planned and we were in a tight spot so we  were forced to make our charge late, but this colt really gave a terrific effort."

Pedigree

References 

2018 racehorse births
Racehorses bred in Japan
Racehorses trained in Japan
Thoroughbred family 2-s